The EURO Gold medal of the Association of European Operational Research Societies (EURO) is the highest distinction within Operations Research (OR) in Europe.
The prize was first awarded to Hans-Jürgen Zimmermann in 1985.

The medal is awarded at EURO-k Conferences, which usually take place twice every three years.
It is granted to an individual or a group for an outstanding contribution to the field of Operations Research.
The Prize is intended to reflect contributions that have stood the test of time, and hence it is awarded for a body of work, rather than a single piece.
The award is a medal in gold, a diploma, and a fee waiver for all future EURO-k conferences.

List of recipients 

 2022 Gilbert Laporte
 2021 Ailsa Land (posthumously) 
 2019 Martine Labbé
 2018 Silvano Martello
 2016 Yurii Nesterov and Maurice Queyranne
 2015 Alexander Schrijver
 2013 Panos M. Pardalos
 2012 Boris Polyak
 2010 Rolf Möhring
 2009 Jacques Benders and Frank Kelly
 2007 Aharon Ben-Tal
 2006 Luk Van Wassenhove
 2004 Martin Grötschel
 2003 András Prékopa
 2001 Egon Balas
 1998 Paolo Toth
 1997 Rainer Burkard and Jan Karel Lenstra
 1995 Dominique de Werra
 1994 Jean-Pierre Brans and Laurence Wolsey
 1992 Bernard Roy
 1991 Jacek Błażewicz, Roman Słowiński, and Jan Węglarz
 1989 Claude Berge
 1988 Martin Beale (posthumously)
 1986 Pierre Hansen and Alexander Rinnooy Kan
 1985 Hans-Jürgen Zimmermann

References

External links 
 

Awards established in 1985
Mathematics awards
1985 establishments in Europe